Remixed may refer to:

Remix, a piece of media altered from its original state
Remix album, an album collecting remixed songs
Remixed Records, a record label associated with Cheiron Studios in Stockholm, Sweden

Albums
Remixed (Alicia Keys album), 2008
Remixed (Amber album), 2000
Remixed (Boom Boom Satellites album), 2012
Remixed (Deborah Cox album), 2003
Remixed (Sarah McLachlan album), 2001
Remixed: The Definitive Collection, by Delerium, 2010
B in the Mix: The Remixes (working title Remixed), by Britney Spears, 2005
Bond Remixed, 2003
Remixed, by Faunts, 2008
Remixed, by Múm, 2001
Remixed, by Shpongle, 2003
Remixed, by Smilers, 2002

EPs
Remixed! (Scissor Sisters EP), 2004
Remixd, by Capital Kings, 2014
Remixed, by Le Car, 2000

See also

:Category:Remix
:Category:Remix albums